KinKi Single Selection II is the second greatest hits album by Japanese duo KinKi Kids. The album was released on December 22, 2004 and debuted at the top of the Oricon charts, selling 356,117 copies in its first week and 544,594 copies by the end of 2005 as it was counted for the 2005 Oricon year (December 6, 2004 to November 28, 2005). It was certified Double Platinum by RIAJ.

Track list

References

External links
KinKi Single Selection II Profile

2004 greatest hits albums
KinKi Kids albums